Jacob Bernard (Jack) de Haas (1875–1940) was a Dutch draughts player who played two matches and two tournaments for the world championship on draughts. He became four times Dutch champion in 1908, 1911, 1916, and 1919.

Life
Jack de Haas was born in London but moved to Rotterdam in the Netherlands with his parents when he was two years old. Two years later, in 1879 he moved to Amsterdam. He became a diamond cutter and moved to Brussels around 1920. From 1931 until his death in 1940 he lived in Scheveningen.

World championships

In 1904 and in 1906 or 1907 he played a match against the holding world champion Isidore Weiss. In 1904 the match ended in a 10-10 draw (this meant that Weiss kept his world title), in 1906 or 1907 the match ended in a 19-21 loss for De Haas.

He played the tournament for the world championship in 1909 ending on a third place behind Weiss and Molimard.

At the world championship from 1912 he ended behind Herman Hoogland on the second place, leaving the French world top places 3 to 6.

Books
Het damspel, theorie en practijk (1908, with Phillip Battefeld)
Voor het dambord (1912, with Phillip Battefeld)

References 

world championships
toernooibase
Een halve eeuw Roozenburg-opstelling (deel 1) by Piet Roozenburg (translated: Half a century of Roozenburg-opstelling. (part 1))

1875 births
1940 deaths
Dutch draughts players
Players of international draughts
Game players from London